Located in the heart of Essex, Massachusetts, the Essex Historical Society & Shipbuilding Museum is sandwiched between an acre of land set aside in 1668, “for a yard to build vessels and employing workmen for this end” and practicing commercial wooden shipyard, owned and operated by Harold A. Burnham. The museum is integral to the town's historic character, scenic vista and central river basin. Essex-built schooners were famous world-wide as sound and able fishing vessels. Essex has a history that is unique among old American villages. A small village, no larger than it is now, on a small tidewater river, built a prodigious number of wooden boats and ships, some four thousand in number, and in the process, developed a reputation for some of the finest fishing schooners in the world.

Founded as The Essex Historical Society in 1937, the organization remains committed to collecting and preserving the unique history of the Village of Essex. The Shipbuilding Museum was established in 1976 as part of the town's observation of the American Revolutionary Bicentennial. In 1990 EHSSM acquired the Evelina M. Goulart which was built in the shipyard in 1927 and used until the 1980s for sword fishing and later as a fishing dragger.  She is one of five historic Essex-built fishing schooners that survive.  In 1993, the society purchased a section of riverfront where shipbuilding flourished for over 300 years. This historic site is where the Story family operated its shipyards from 1813 to the end of World War II.  The yard is still active and showcases machines, tools, materials and boats. The Chebacco Boat, Lewis H. Story, flagship of the Museum, was built on the site in 1998 and is often seen at the Museum or at nautical events throughout New England.

The Museum maintains one of the most important maritime collections in the region which includes antique tools, photographs, documents, exhibits portraying both the shipbuilding industry and life in the quintessential small American town of Essex.

Currently EHSSM hosts a diverse number of programs. Education programs host students for project-based learning that exposes students to our history, the shipbuilding process, and our community.  They have an engaging evening lecture series on topics surrounding the shipbuilding, fishing, and other marine industry. They also host workshops practicing traditional arts and skills. EHSSM has a diverse and dedicated group of shipyard volunteers that come every Saturday year round that keep the facilities and vessels up to date and ready for visitors. They host many large scale community based events and provide a central location for the community to gather around.

The Essex Shipbuilding Museum is a maritime museum in Essex, Massachusetts which contains historical and demonstrative displays regarding the history of the wooden shipbuilding industry in Essex. Essex produced more wooden fishing schooners between 1668 and the twentieth century than anywhere else in America. The museum contains various ship models and half hulls including several on display from the Smithsonian Institution. Displays include antique shipbuilding tools, photos, and dioramas of the former shipyard.

The museum also features the Evelina M. Goulart, an Essex-built schooner built in 1927.

Adjacent to the museum is a boat yard owned by generations of the Story Family, which still constructs and launches classic wooden ships built in the Essex tradition.

See also 
 :Category:Ships built in Essex, Massachusetts
 List of maritime museums in the United States

References

External links
Official website

Maritime museums in Massachusetts
Buildings and structures in Essex, Massachusetts
Museums in Essex County, Massachusetts
Industry museums in Massachusetts
Shipbuilding in the United States